Andy Mouse is a series of silkscreen prints created by American artist Keith Haring in 1986. The character Andy Mouse is a fusion between Disney's Mickey Mouse and Andy Warhol. The series consists of four silkscreen prints on wove paper, all signed and dated in pencil by Haring and Warhol. 

Andy Mouse sold for $56,400 at Christie's in December 2001. It sold for $629,000 at Christie's in April 2015.

History 
Andy Warhol rose to prominence as the leading artist of the 1960s Pop art movement. He ventured into a variety of art forms and challenged the notion of the "sacred" definition of art by controversially blurring the lines between life and art. Warhol's popularity had waned by the late 1970s, but he had a resurgence of success in the 1980s, partially due to his affiliation with prolific younger artists who were dominating the downtown New York art scene.

Haring moved to Manhattan to attend the School of Visual Arts in 1978. He gained recognition for his chalk graffiti drawings in the New York City Subway, which led to gallery exhibitions in the early 1980s. Haring idolized Warhol and considered him the only "real" Pop artist. They met shortly before Haring's exhibition at the Tony Shafrazi Gallery. Warhol mentions in his diaries going to the closing party of the exhibition at Shafrazi on November 13, 1982. In 1989, Haring recalled when he met Warhol:Before I knew him, he had been an image to me. He was totally unapproachable. I met him finally through Christopher Makos, who brought me to the Factory. At first Andy was very distant. It was difficult for him to be comfortable with people if he didn’t know them. Then he came to another exhibition at the Fun Gallery, which was soon after the show at Shafrazi. He was more friendly. We started talking, going out. We traded a lot of works at that time." Haring was compared to Warhol, which Haring refuted stating that he was a "different kind of artist." He added, "Andy has been a big influence as an example of both what to be and what not to be. I have learned a lot of things from Andy about how to deal with people and how to deal with 'the public' and the public's 'image' of me." Warhol and Haring began collaborating in 1986 with the Andy Mouse series.  Mickey Mouse appeared frequently in Haring's artwork and he created a Mickey Mouse watch in 1986 for his Pop Shop.

Soon after the completion of the series, Warhol died following gallbladder surgery on February 22, 1987. Haring, who was diagnosed with HIV/AIDS in 1987, died of AIDS-related complications on February 16, 1990.

Analysis 
The character Andy Mouse is a depiction of Andy Warhol as Mickey Mouse. Haring and Warhol both had a fascination with Disney, particularly Mickey Mouse.

In one of the portraits, Andy Mouse is pictured on a dollar bill. Haring stated: "It’s like treating him [Warhol] like he was part of American culture, like Mickey Mouse was. That he himself had become a symbol, a sign for something complete, universally understandable. He sort of made this niche for himself in the culture. As much as Mickey Mouse had…putting him on a dollar bill was just making him even more like an icon or part of the American dream."

Richard Lloyd, International Head of Prints & Multiples, analyzed that "Andy Mouse is a brilliant culmination of Haring's entire oeuvre. Its bold graphic quality, complex composition and glorious color are high water marks for the artist. Andy Mouse's large scale and brilliant postmodern referencing of Pop icons such as Mickey Mouse—by way of Andy Warhol—mark this as a seminal Haring work which remains relevant to contemporary art today."

References 

Paintings by Keith Haring
1986 paintings
Mickey Mouse in art
Cultural depictions of Andy Warhol